Lepidochrysops lukenia, the Lukenia blue, is a butterfly in the family Lycaenidae. It is found in Kenya (south and south-east of Nairobi) and north-eastern Tanzania. The habitat consists of areas with short grass mixed with flowers of the family Lamiaceae, other herbs on rocky ground on hills and ridges, and deciduous woodland at altitudes between 1,200 and 2,200 meters.

It is a seasonal species, emerging shortly after the onset of the rains, when Lamiacae begin to flower

The larvae feed on Lamiaceae species.

References

Butterflies described in 1957
Lepidochrysops